Tommy Gunn may refer to:
Tommy Gunn (character), a character from Rocky V
Tommy Gunn (actor) (born 1967), American pornographic actor
Tommy Gunn (toy), an action figure produced by Pedigree Toys Ltd

See also
Tommy gun, or Thompson submachine gun
"Tommy Gun" (song)
Tommy Gun (book)

Gunn, Tommy